The 8th Vuelta a España (Tour of Spain), a long-distance bicycle stage race and one of the three grand tours, was held from 13 June to 4 July 1948. Ruiz also won the mountains classification.

Teams and riders

Route

Results

Final General Classification

References

 
1948
1948 in road cycling
1948 in Spanish sport